Mbenza is a surname and given name. Notable people with the name include:

Given name 
Mbenza Bedi (born 1984), Congolese footballer

Surname 
Guy Mbenza (born 2000), Congolese footballer
Isaac Mbenza (born 1996), Belgian footballer
Pasi Mbenza (born 1966), Congolese cyclist
Syran Mbenza (born 1950), Congolese guitarist